The Our Lady of the Incarnation Cathedral  also called San Miguel de Tucumán Cathedral It is the mother church of the city of San Miguel de Tucuman, in the province of Tucuman, in the South American country of Argentina. The temple was founded in the sixteenth century and is home to the metropolitana Archdiocese of Tucuman.

The foundations of this cathedral building date from the period of the definitive founding of the city of San Miguel de Tucuman in 1685, long remained a humble building adobes with gabled of "musleras tiles" then keeping some simple style details Hispanic American colonial baroque.

In the mid-nineteenth century it is that parts began with the plans of the architect of Basque origin and French Pierre Etcheverry, such work is what has left virtually the building with the current appearance, being developed for the provincial government of Celedonio Gutierrez and inaugurated on February 19, 1856.

See also
Roman Catholicism in Argentina

References

Roman Catholic cathedrals in Argentina
Buildings and structures in San Miguel de Tucumán
Roman Catholic churches completed in 1856
19th-century Roman Catholic church buildings in Argentina